Dehydrogenase E1 and transketolase domain containing 1 is a protein that in humans is encoded by the DHTKD1 gene. This gene encodes a component of a mitochondrial 2-oxoglutarate-dehydrogenase-complex-like protein involved in the degradation pathways of several amino acids, including lysine. Mutations in this gene are associated with 2-aminoadipic 2-oxoadipic aciduria and Charcot-Marie-Tooth Disease Type 2Q.

Structure 

The DHTKD1 gene encodes a protein that has 919 amino acids, and is one of two isoforms within the 2-oxoglutarate-dehydrogenase complex.

Function 

DHTKD1 is part of an OGDHc-like supercomplex that is responsible for a crucial step in the degradation pathways of L-lysine, L-hydroxylysine, and L-tryptophan. Specifically, this enzyme catalyzes the decarboxylation of 2-oxoadipate to glutaryl-CoA.
There is a strong correlation between DHTKD1 expression levels and ATP production, which signifies that DHTKD1 plays a critical role in energy production in mitochondria. Moreover, suppression of DHTKD1 results in decreased levels of biogenesis and increased levels of reactive oxygen species (ROS) within the mitochondria. Globally, this impairs cell growth and enhances cell apoptosis.

Clinical significance 

Mutations in the DHTKD1 gene are associated with alpha-aminoadipic and alpha-ketoadipic aciduria, an autosomal recessive inborn error of lysine, hydroxylysine, and tryptophan degradation. Only a handful of mutations have been observed in patients, including three missense mutations, two nonsense mutations, two splice donor mutations, one duplication, and one deletion and insertion. Two missense mutations are the most common cause of the deficiency. The clinical presentation of this disease in inconsistent.

Mutations in this gene could also cause neurological abnormalities. Indeed, one form of Charcot-Marie-Tooth (CMT) disease has been associated with DHTKD1, although the disease encompasses a wide spectrum of clinical neuropathies. Specifically, a hyterozygous nonsense mutation within the gene leads to decreased levels of DHTKD1 mRNA and proteins, and impaired ATP generation. This implicates this mutation as a causative agent for CMT-2 Disease.

References

Further reading